A list of Portuguese films that were first released in 2006.

See also
2006 in Portugal

References

2006
Lists of 2006 films by country or language
2006 in Portugal